The 2012–13 Copa Chile, (officially known as Copa Chile MTS 2012/13 because of its sponsorship), is the 33rd edition of the Copa Chile, the country's national cup tournament. The competition started on June 23, 2012 with the First Round and concludes on May 8, 2013 with the Final. The winner qualifies for the 2013 Copa Sudamericana.

Schedule

Teams
A total 46 clubs were accepted for the competition. The teams for this edition are the teams from the Primera División, Primera B, Segunda División, and selected Tercera División teams.

Primera División

Antofagasta
Cobreloa
Cobresal
Iquique
La Serena
Unión San Felipe
Unión La Calera
Santiago Wanderers
Universidad Católica
Unión Española
Universidad de Chile
Colo-Colo
Palestino
Audax Italiano
O'Higgins
Rangers
Huachipato
Universidad de Concepción

Primera B

San Marcos de Arica
Coquimbo Unido
San Luis
Everton
Magallanes
Barnechea
Santiago Morning
Curicó Unido
Ñublense
Naval
Deportes Concepción
Lota Schwager
Unión Temuco
Puerto Montt

Segunda División

Copiapó
Melipilla
Fernández Vial
Iberia
Temuco
Provincial Osorno

Tercera División

Trasandino
Deportes Quilicura
Provincial Talagante
San Antonio Unido
Enfoque de Rancagua
Colchagua
Linares
Valdivia

First round
This round comprised the 2012 Primera B teams, 6 Segunda División and 8 Tercera División teams.

Second round
The Second Round marks the beginning of the competition for Primera División teams. This round comprised the winners of the First Round and the 2012 Primera División teams. Every team plays home and away against every other team in its group. The best 2 teams from each group advance to the next round.

Group 1

Group 2

Group 3

Group 4

Group 5

Group 6

Group 7

Group 8

Third round

Quarterfinals

Universidad Católica won 11–3 on aggregate.

Universidad de Chile won 5–0 on aggregate.

Cobreloa won 4–3 on aggregate.

Unión Española won 5–2 on aggregate.

Semifinals

Final

Top goalscorers

References
 Official site of the Copa Chile 
 Official regulations 
 Copa Chile 2012, Soccerway.com

Copa Chile
Copa Chile
Chile
Copa Chile seasons